Wei Lijie (born 2 June 1974) is a Chinese Antarctic researcher, best known for her work on the paleontology and stratigraphy of Tibet and the Antarctic.

Early life and education
Wei is from China and was born in Longyao, Hebei on June 2, 1974. She received her master's degree in paleontology and stratigraphy at Lanzhou University in 2006 and got her doctor degree in structural geology at the Institute of Tibetan Plateau Research, Chinese Academy of Sciences in 2011.

Career and impact
Wei has been an Associate Professor in the Institute of Geomechanics, Chinese Academy of Geological Sciences since 2013. Her main research interests are paleontology and stratigraphy, in particular, study of the Cenozoic palynology of Tibet and Antarctica. She leads a research project on the Neogene palynology from the eastern and western margins of the Lambert Glacier of East Antarctica.

Wei participated in the 26th Chinese National Antarctic Research Expedition (October 2009-April 2010) and carried out geological investigation in the Grove Mountains area of East Antarctica. She was the first woman researcher from China to carry out geological research in the Antarctic inland.

Wei served as visiting scholar in the Institute of Geological and Nuclear Science, New Zealand from August to October, 2011. From 2011-2013 she was a postdoctoral fellow in the Institute of Geology and Geophysics, Chinese Academy of Sciences.

Selected works

References

External links
 

Chinese women geologists
1974 births
Living people
Chinese Antarctic scientists
Women Antarctic scientists
20th-century women scientists
21st-century women scientists
Women paleontologists
Biologists from Hebei
People from Xingtai
People's Republic of China science writers
Writers from Hebei
Educators from Hebei
Chinese paleontologists